José Félix Trespalacios (died August 4, 1835) was the first governor of Coahuila y Texas as part of the United Mexican States.

Career 

Trespalacios was a member of the militia in Chihuahua but then in 1814 was charged with organizing rebellion and was sentenced to death.  His sentence was reduced to ten years in prison, but he escaped and joined the forces of Sebastián González (or Gonzales).  He was captured again in 1816 and was imprisoned at San Juan de Ulúa but managed to escape.  At this point Trespalacios fled to New Orleans and joined forces with James Long becoming part of the second Long Expedition after the first part of it was destroyed in Nacogdoches.  He then joined forces with Benjamin Rush Milam and invaded the Yucatan. Trespalacios went to  Campeche where he was arrested and locked up in prison. However, later he was released by Iturbide. Thus, later became colonel of cavalry by the regency. From August 1822 to April 1823 Trespalacios served as governor of Texas.  From 1831-1833 he served as a member of the Mexican Senate from Chihuahua. on January 10, 1833 held the office of inspector general and commander of Chihuahua, leaving the army on December 15, 1834. He died on August 4, 1835 in Allende, Chihuahua.

References

Sources
A database of early Texas history, see the part under the James Long expedition

Mexican revolutionaries
Members of the Senate of the Republic (Mexico)
Governors of Mexican Texas
1835 deaths
Year of birth missing